The empire on which the sun never sets is a term for particular global empires, the idea being that they were so extensive that there was always at least one part of their territory in daylight.

The Sun Never Sets may also refer to:

 The Sun Never Sets (film), a 1939 film starring Basil Rathbone
 The Sun Never Sets (TV series), a 2000 Japanese television series
 The Sun Never Sets (album), a 2005 album by Australian band The Herd

See also
A Sun That Never Sets
The Sun Will Never Set
Where the Sun Never Sets